The 2014 Bonaire League season was the 46th season of the Bonaire League.

Teams
Nine teams compete in the league with SV Juventus defending its title from the 2013 season. The number of teams for 2014 remains the same with no relegation or promotion from the previous season. All clubs play their games at Stadion Antonio Trenidat in Rincon. The stadium has a capacity of 1,500 people.

Table and Results

Standings

Results

References

Bonaire League seasons
Bonaire
Bonaire
2014 in Bonaire